The Pilgrim's Progress is a 2019 American computer-animated Christian fantasy adventure film written and directed by Robert Fernandez and featuring the voices of David Thorpe, John Rhys-Davies and Kristyn Getty. It is based on John Bunyan's 1678 novel The Pilgrim's Progress.

Cast

Reception
On review aggregator Rotten Tomatoes the film has an approval rating of 60% rating.

Cath Clarke of The Guardian gave the film two out of five stars. She criticized the animation, stiff character animation, the amateur theatre dialogue, and for "virtually zero humour." Joyce Slayton of Common Sense Media gave the film two out of five stars as well.

Megan Basham of WORLD Magazine gave the film a more positive write-up, and praised the introduction with Kristyn Getty and some of the scenes, saying they "delight with ingenuity." She said some of the scenes "show budget constraints," but that "these gripes are surprisingly few." Courtney Howard of Variety said, "While this adaptation may not win over any new converts, it does serve as a blessed reminder of faith’s rewards in a seemingly endless, punishing, and dark time." David Aldridge of Radio Times gave the film 3 out of 5, describing the animation as "basic but effective" and that the film was "presumably aimed primarily at kids, yet whose symbolic vision will require considerable explanation from adults."

References

External links
 Official website
 

John Bunyan
American children's animated films
American computer-animated films
2019 computer-animated films
2019 films
Animated films based on British novels
2010s English-language films
2010s American films